Alice Allegra Englert (born 15 June 1994) is an Australian actress, director, writer, singer, and songwriter. She is best known for her roles as Rosa in the film Ginger & Rosa (2012) and Lena Duchannes in the film Beautiful Creatures (2013).

Early life
Alice Allegra Englert was born in Sydney in June 1994, the daughter of New Zealand filmmaker Jane Campion and Australian filmmaker Colin Englert. She is the maternal granddaughter of actress Edith Campion and theatre director Richard Campion. She was raised in Sydney and various locations where her parents' work took the family, explaining, "I’ve spent half my life on planes. I have a lot of love for New Zealand, though. That is where the really arty, whimsical side of the family resided." She attended schools in Australia, New Zealand, New York City, Rome, and London, as well as other places in England such as the Sibford School, a Quaker school in Oxfordshire. Her parents divorced when she was seven. She later left high school to become an actress.

Career
Englert made her film debut at the age of eight in a film called Listen, followed by an appearance in her mother's short film The Water Diary at the age of 12. She appeared in the sci-fi romance film The Lovers, which was showcased at the 2012 Cannes Film Festival and was later released on DVD in the UK as Time Traveller in 2016. In 2012, she starred in Ginger & Rosa. In 2013, she starred in the low-budget horror film In Fear and the supernatural romance film Beautiful Creatures, which was based on the novel of the same name. "Needle and Thread", a song written and performed by Englert, was used in the film's soundtrack. In an interview, she stated that she recorded the song "in the bathroom of the apartment [she] was staying in the Warehouse District of New Orleans". She had a role in 2020's Ratched on Netflix.

Filmography

Film

Television

Awards and nominations

References

External links
 

1994 births
Living people

21st-century Australian actresses

Australian child actresses
Australian film actresses
Actresses from Sydney
Australian people of New Zealand descent